A total solar eclipse occurred on August 29, 1886. A solar eclipse occurs when the Moon passes between Earth and the Sun, thereby totally or partly obscuring the image of the Sun for a viewer on Earth. A total solar eclipse occurs when the Moon's apparent diameter is larger than the Sun's, blocking all direct sunlight, turning day into darkness. Totality occurs in a narrow path across Earth's surface, with the partial solar eclipse visible over a surrounding region thousands of kilometres wide.

Observations

References

 NASA graphic
 Googlemap
 NASA Besselian elements
 

1886 08 29
1886 in science
1886 08 29
August 1886 events